Lehigh Acres is an unincorporated area and Municipal District in Lee County, Florida, United States. As of the 2020 Census the population was 135,272. Lehigh Acres is part of the Cape Coral-Fort Myers, Florida Metropolitan Statistical Area. Lehigh Acres is also one of the fastest growing communities in the State of Florida as well as the United States.

A large portion of the community is served by the Lehigh Acres Municipal Services Improvement District, a special-purpose district created by the Florida Legislature which covers areas in Lee and neighboring Hendry County.

Geography
Lehigh Acres is located in eastern Lee County at  (26.608333, -81.639167). It is bordered to the north by Alva, to the northwest by Buckingham, and to the southwest by Gateway, all unincorporated. It is bordered on the west by the city of Fort Myers, the Lee county seat, and extends east to the Hendry County line.

Florida State Road 82 forms the southern border of the community; the highway leads west  to the center of Fort Myers and southeast  to Immokalee.

History
Lehigh Acres was developed in the mid-1950s by Chicago businessman Lee Ratner. Seeking a tax shelter, Ratner had sold his pest control business and faced the possibility of losing most of his earnings to the high capital gains tax of that era. Ratner heard that cattle was a good investment for people in his predicament, and he bought  of land in eastern Lee County and named it the Lucky Lee Ranch. After ranching for a while, and despite having no prior development experience, Ratner joined with Gerald H. Gould, a Florida advertising executive, Manuel Riskin, a Chicago CPA, and Edward Shapiro, a former Chicagoan who was in the real estate business in California, and began land sales at Lehigh Acres.

Gerald Gould was the president of the corporation that developed Lehigh Acres, which began in 1954. He remained as president until the company was sold in 1972.

Since the days of the Lucky Lee Ranch, the boundaries of Lehigh Acres have stretched to cover , including the runways of the former Buckingham Army Airfield, a major Army Air Forces training base that was closed at the end of World War II. Strips of land along major thoroughfares, such as Homestead Road and Lee Boulevard, were set aside for commerce. In 1997, nearly 90% of Lehigh Acres' lots remained vacant.

In 1992, Lee County, with the cooperation of a new developer, declared Lehigh Acres to be blighted, and authorized its Community Redevelopment Agency to take steps towards improving infrastructure and planning elements neglected by the original developer. It is estimated that nearly $11 million would be needed to repave the development's roads.

A surge in housing prices led to a boom in Lehigh Acres new-housing construction from 2003 to 2007, peaking at more than 7,500 new homes constructed in 2006. The number of homes built during this period exceeded the total number of homes constructed during the preceding 50 years.

But as in much of the United States, the real-estate boom of the 2000s went bust. The median house price in the Fort Myers area peaked in late 2005 at $322,300. Three years later, it had plummeted to $106,900. A reliance on construction jobs no longer available pushed the unemployment rate in the area of Lehigh Acres and Fort Myers to 14% by the summer of 2009. Property values reached a low in 2008 of $106,900. By late 2014, property values averaged $169,200.

Demographics

As of 2010, there were 38,995 households. As of 2000, 32.3% had children under the age of 18 living with them, 58.4% were married couples living together, 10.2% had a female householder with no husband present, and 27.2% were non-families. 22.0% of all households were made up of individuals, and 13.2% had someone living alone who was 65 years of age or older.  The average household size was 2.62 and the average family size was 3.03.

In 2000, the CDP the population was spread out, with 26.0% under the age of 18, 6.8% from 18 to 24, 27.3% from 25 to 44, 20.4% from 45 to 64, and 19.5% who were 65 years of age or older.  The median age was 38 years. For every 100 females, there were 94.0 males.  For every 100 females age 18 and over, there were 88.5 males.

As of 2000, the median income for a household in the CDP was $31,517, and the median income for a family was $35,492. Males had a median income of $25,202 versus $19,935 for females. The per capita income for the CDP was $17,186. By 2016, this figure rose to $17,222. About 9.8% of families and 11.7% of the population were below the poverty line, including 11.5% of those under age 18 and 7.6% of those age 65 or over. By 2017, median household income was $46,649.

Languages
As of 2000, 84.52% of residents spoke English as their first language, while 11.81% spoke Spanish, 1.34% spoke German, and 0.83% spoke French as their mother tongue. In total, 15.47% of the total population spoke languages other than English.

Public transportation
Lehigh Acres is served by LeeTran buses.

References

External links
 Hubert B. Stroud and William M. Spikowski, "Planning in the Wake of Florida Land Scams", Journal of Planning Education and Research (includes Lehigh Acres as redevelopment model)

Census-designated places in Lee County, Florida
Census-designated places in Florida
Populated places established in 1954